Shabib Jovijari (born in 1967, Ahwaz) is one of the representatives of Ahwaz in the Islamic Consultative Assembly (Iran's parliament) and is a member of the "National Security and Foreign Policy Commission" in the Majlis. Jovijari who is among the Iranian Arabs, was also the representative of the people of Ahvaz, Bavi, Hamidiyeh and Karun in the seventh and eighth terms of the Islamic Consultative Assembly.

Life 
Shabib Jovijari was born in a religious family in 1967 in the city of Ahvaz. His father, Abdul Hamid Joveijari, was the representative and lawyer of all Maraja-al-Taqlid. Shabib Joveijari is the current representative of Ahwaz in the Majlis, and was the "Deputy Minister of Strategic Affairs" in the Government and Parliament of The World Forum for Proximity of Islamic Schools of Thought. He was also the chairman of the "Parliamentary Committee of the Secretariat of the Supreme National Security Council" and Ambassador of the Islamic Republic of Iran to the Republic of Sudan and Eritrea.

See also 
 Seyyed Karim Hosseini
 Mojtaba Yousefi (politician)
 List of Iran's parliament representatives (8th term)

References 

1967 births
Living people
Members of the Islamic Consultative Assembly by term
Members of the 11th Islamic Consultative Assembly
Members of the 8th Islamic Consultative Assembly
Members of the 7th Islamic Consultative Assembly
People from Ahvaz
Iranian Arab politicians